Boeil-Bezing is a commune in the Pyrénées-Atlantiques department in southwestern France.

The municipality of Boeil-Bezing arises in 1867 from the meeting of both villages of Boeil and Bezing, situated along the banks of the mountain stream of Pau, on territories rich in alluviums useful for the agriculture.

See also
Communes of the Pyrénées-Atlantiques department

References

Communes of Pyrénées-Atlantiques
Pyrénées-Atlantiques communes articles needing translation from French Wikipedia